The Skyfly S-34 Skystar is a Swiss ultralight aircraft, designed by Hans Gygax and produced by Skyfly, of Altbüron. The aircraft is supplied as a kit for amateur construction or as a complete ready-to-fly-aircraft.

Design and development
The Skystar features a strut-braced high-wing, a two-seats-in-tandem open cockpit with a windshield, fixed tricycle landing gear with optional wheel pants and a single engine in pusher configuration.

The aircraft is made from bolted-together aluminum tubing, with its flying surfaces covered in Dacron sailcloth. A fibreglass cockpit fairing is available. The standard engine available is the  Rotax 582 two-stroke powerplant.

Specifications (S-34 Skystar)

See also
Similar aircraft
Spectrum Beaver

References

External links

Photo of a Skyfly S-34 Skystar

1990s Swiss ultralight aircraft
Homebuilt aircraft
Single-engined pusher aircraft